The 2003 Tour de Romandie was the 57th edition of the Tour de Romandie cycle race and was held from 29 April to 4 May 2003. The race started in Geneva and finished in Lausanne. The race was won by Tyler Hamilton of the CSC team.

General classification

References

2003
Tour de Romandie